The barred minnow (Opsaridium zambezense) is a species of cyprinid fish found in river systems from the Democratic Republic of Congo, south to Namibia, Zimbabwe and far northern areas of South Africa.

References

Opsaridium
Freshwater fish of Africa
Fish described in 1852
Taxa named by Wilhelm Peters